Robert Joseph McClellan (born January 31, 1981) is an American college baseball coach and former pitcher. He is the head baseball coach at the New Jersey Institute of Technology. McClellan played college baseball at Seward County Community College from 2001 to 2002 and Arizona State University in 2003 before pursuing a professional career.

Coaching career
On August 28, 2018, McClellan was named the interim head coach of the NJIT Highlanders baseball team. After leading the Highlanders to a 17–27–1 season in 2019, he was named the full-time head coach on June 9, 2019.

Head coaching record

See also
 List of current NCAA Division I baseball coaches

References

External links

NJIT Highlanders bio

1981 births
Living people
Baseball pitchers
Seward County Saints baseball players
Arizona State Sun Devils baseball players
Wilmington Blue Rocks players
Arizona League Royals players
Burlington Bees players
Traverse City Beach Bums players
Chandler–Gilbert Coyotes baseball coaches
NJIT Highlanders baseball coaches